IEA may refer to:

Education
 Instituto Español de Andorra, an international school in Spain
 International Association for the Evaluation of Educational Achievement

Policy bodies
 Institute of Economic Affairs, a British think tank
 Institute of International and European Affairs (formerly Institute of European Affairs), an Irish think tank
 International Energy Agency, an intergovernmental organisation based in Paris

Science and medicine
 Institute of Ethnology and Anthropology, Russia
 International Epidemiological Association
 International Ergonomics Association
 Involuntary Emergency Admission, in psychiatry